Óscar Antonio Ulloa (born 16 September 1963) is a retired Salvadoran professional football player.

Club career
Nicknamed el Lagarto (the Lizard), the moustached Ulloa has played for Alianza, Isidro Metapán and FAS among others, winning league titles with Alianza and FAS.

International career
Ulloa made his debut for El Salvador in an August 1987 Pan American Games match against Trinidad & Tobago and has earned a total of 31 caps, scoring 8 goals. He has represented his country in 11 FIFA World Cup qualification matches (in which he scored six) as well as at the 1991 and 1993 UNCAF Nations Cups.

His final international was a May 1993 FIFA World Cup qualification match against Honduras.

International goals
Scores and results list El Salvador's goal tally first.

Personal life
Ulloa is the father of current Salvadoran league players Óscar Ulloa and Ricardo Ulloa who both play for FAS.

References

1963 births
Living people
Association football forwards
Salvadoran footballers
El Salvador international footballers
Alianza F.C. footballers
C.D. FAS footballers
A.D. Isidro Metapán footballers
Footballers at the 1987 Pan American Games
Pan American Games competitors for El Salvador